Dubul' ibhunu, translated as shoot the Boer or kill the Boer, is a controversial South African song. It is sung in Xhosa and Zulu.

Depending on the interpretation, the song might refer to institutional structures such as the National Party (NP); or to specific groups of people such as members of the South African Police (colloquially known as "Boers") and armed forces during apartheid.

Supporters of the song, particularly Black South Africans, see that it is a liberation song that articulates an important part of South Africa's history. They say the song is meant to be interpeted symbolically as an expression of anger and frustation for the horrors of the apartheid, and a desire to fight for liberation. 
Critics of the song, particularly White South Africans, claim it is an example of anti-white racism celebrating violence, against Boers, the wider Afrikaner ethnic group, white farmers, or even white South Africans generally.

Controversy 
The song originates in the struggle against apartheid when it was first sung to protest the Afrikaner dominated apartheid government of South Africa.

In post-apartheid South Africa the song has been most notably sung by then African National Congress Youth League leader Julius Malema and then South African President Jacob Zuma. Critics of the song such as AfriForum and TAU-SA state the song encourages and can be partly blamed for the violent attacks on South African farms owned by white people.

In 2011, the South Gauteng High Court ruled that the song was discriminatory, harmful, undermined the dignity of Afrikaners, and thereby constituted hate speech.  The court ruled that Julius Malema, who was brought before the court for previously singing the song at rallies, was forbidden from singing it in the future. Following the ruling Malema changed the wording of the song to "Kiss the Boer" and sang that instead—however, it can be argued to still have the same psychological influence as the original, due to the well-known context for the altered lyrics. The following year, the African National Congress stated that they would not sing the song any more.

Malema again appeared in court in 2022 for allegedly singing the song in a case brought by Afriforum where the issue of whether or not the song was hate speech was debated. Judge Edwin Molahlehi of the Johannesburg High Court found that the chant and song was not intended to be taken seriously, that the reference to "boer" did not literally refer to white or Afrikaans people, and that it did not incite hatred towards white people generally; therefore the song was not hate speech. Afriforum seeks to appeal the judgement to the supreme court.

Lyrics

See also 
 Kill Haole Day
 Dog whistle (politics)

References 

Anti-apartheid songs
Protest songs
Political songs
South African political slogans
Songs about white people
Censorship in South Africa
Race-related controversies in music